Poetics Today: International Journal for Theory and Analysis of Literature and Communication is a quarterly peer-reviewed academic journal in the field of poetics. The editors-in-chief are Irene Tucker and Milette Shamir.

Abstracting and indexing 
The journal is abstracted and indexed in:

External links 
 

Duke University Press academic journals
Quarterly journals
Publications established in 1979